UK Blak is the debut studio album by British singer Caron Wheeler. It was released on 15 May 1990 by EMI Records. Recording sessions for the album took place from January 1990 to March 1990 at several studios, during the hiatus from her group Soul II Soul. As executive producer of the album, Wheeler took a wider role in its production, co-writing a majority of the songs, choosing which ones to produce and sharing ideas on the mixing and mastering of tracks. The album includes the single "Livin' in the Light", which reached the UK Top 20, plus three further singles, "UK Blak", "Blue (Is the Colour of Pain)" and "Don't Quit".

Background
In 1990, Wheeler left Soul II Soul to pursue a solo career, and shortly after leaving the group she secured a contract with RCA/EMI Records. The album charted well in the UK Albums Chart with the help of the first single "Livin' in the Light".

In the album liner notes, it is said that "This album was made with loving thoughts of Martin Shure, and inspired by Skakti Gawain and Marvin Gaye."

Track listing

Personnel

 Caron Wheeler – lead vocals (All tracks), backing vocals (tracks 1-14), producer (tracks 1, 4-7), executive producer, vocal producer (1, 4-7), songwriter (1-14)
 Aniija – mbira
 Karl Atkins – keyboards (track 2), songwriter (track 4, 5)
 Tim Atkins – drum programming (track 2, 4, 5), songwriter (track 4, 5)
 Afrika Baby Bam – producer (track 2, 14), programming (14), songwriter (track 2, 14)
 Trevor Bedford – additional recording engineer (track 1)
 Rick Bell - saxophone (track 14)
 Blacksmith – producer (track 2, 4, 5)
 Bolaii Adeola Badeio – backing vocals (tracks 12)
 Boy George – songwriter (track 3)
 Brian Bramble – bass, drum programming, synthesizer programming (track 8, 12)
 Clevie Browne - drums and producer (track 11, 13), songwriter (track 13)
 Danny Browne – guitar (track 11, 13)
 Mark Brydon – producer and songwriter (track 3)
 Ray Carless – saxophone (track 8)
 Clinton Clarke – trombone (track 8)
 Colin – assistant recording engineer (track 2, 5)
 Victor Cross – keyboards (track 3)
 DJ Devastate – additional programming (track 8, 12)
 Pandit Dinesh – percussion (track 6, 8, 12)
 Adam Fuest – recording engineer (track 2, 4, 5, 8, 10-13)
 Roger Guthrie – saxophone (track 11)
 Lee Hamblin – recording engineer (track 6, 7)
 Jimmy "Senya" Haynes – producer and songwriter (track 9)
 Mickey Isley – assistant engineer (track 14)

 Derek Johnson – guitar (track 1, 5, 10)
 Wycliffe Johnson – keyboards, producer, songwriter (track 11, 13)
 Ben Jones – tape op (track 3)
 Mr. Lawnee – scratches (track 14)
 Gregg Mann – mixing (track 14)
 Carl McIntosh – producer and songwriter (track 1)
 MC Mell'O' - rap and songwriter (track 5)
 Dick "TCB" Meaney – assistant recording engineer (track 4, 6-13)
 Gordon Milne – recording engineer (track 1)
 Clifton "Bigga" Morrison – keyboards (track 1)
 Mike Gee – bass (track 14)
 Robert Power – recording engineer (track 14)
 Errol Reid – keyboards (track 7)
 Arabella Rodriguez – mixing (track 1, 3, 6, 7, 9)
 Dr. Shane Faber – keyboards and recording engineer (track 14)
 Ray Simpson – lead vocals, backing vocals, keyboards, drum programming (track 7)
 Simon Stirling – strings arrangement (track 6)
 Stephen Steward – recording engineer (track 11, 13)
 Stevie G – bass, drum programming, synthesizer programming (track 8, 12)
 Robert Sithole – flute (track 12)
 Towa Tei – producer (track 14)
 Henry "Buttons" Tenyue – brass (track 1)
 Patrick Tenyue – brass (track 1)
 Peter Trotman – bass (track 2, 4), songwriter (track 4, 5), vocal arrangement (track 5)
 The Twilight Firm – producer (track 1, 8, 12)
 Carl Ward – producer (track 7)
 Sheila Watts – harp (track 7)

Charts and certifications

Weekly charts

Certifications and sales

References 

1990 debut albums
Caron Wheeler albums
RCA Records albums
New jack swing albums
Electronica albums by British artists